Aleko Mulos was the first ever Turkish man to compete at the Olympic Games, doing so in 1908.  Turkey has yet to field a team at the Olympics but had individual athletes compete at the 2016 and 2020 Olympic Games.  At the 2020 Olympic Games Ferhat Arıcan became the first Turkish male gymnast to win an Olympic medal, earning bronze on the parallel bars.

Gymnasts

Summer Olympics

Youth Olympics

Medalists

See also
 Turkey men's national artistic gymnastics team

References

gymnasts
Turkey